Sessilifolia is a specific epithet and may refer to:

Aglaia sessilifolia, Borneo
Axinaea sessilifolia, Ecuador
Diervilla sessilifolia, United States
Drosera sessilifolia, South America
Horsfieldia sessilifolia, Malaysia
Renealmia sessilifolia, Ecuador
Salix sessilifolia, North America
Uvularia sessilifolia, North America